The  United States Post Office is an historic building located in downtown Iowa Falls, Iowa, United States.  Built in 1914, the structure was designed in the Neoclassical style, with Oscar Wenderoth as the supervising architect.  The 1893 Colombian Exposition in Chicago was a major influence in the building's design.  The foundation is composed of North Carolina granite, while the walls are dark red brick that is laid in an English cross bond.  The main entrance is framed by a portico that is held up by four columns of the Doric order.  The interior features woodwork of white oak, a marble-terrazo floor, and a vaulted ceiling. It was listed on the National Register of Historic Places in 1994.

See also 
List of United States post offices

References 

Government buildings completed in 1914
Neoclassical architecture in Iowa
Iowa Falls, Iowa
Buildings and structures in Hardin County, Iowa
Post office buildings on the National Register of Historic Places in Iowa
National Register of Historic Places in Hardin County, Iowa